Khajaguda is a major commercial and residential area in Hyderabad, Telangana, in the suburb of Gachibowli. It is in the vicinity of Nanakramguda Financial district, Gachibowli and HITEC City. Several residential apartments like ASBL Lakeside, IT HEIGHTS, Niharika Interlake, Niharika Lakefront are situated in Khajaguda.

Sights 

Khajaguda Talab (Pedda Cheruvu) and its adjoining area is developed into a beautiful lakefront.
Khajaguda Lake and the Khajaguda Hills (Fakhruddin Gutta) on its Southern shore, are a popular spot for outdoor activities, such as hiking and bouldering. 
 Embassy SAS iTower, a very high-rise commercial complex is situated on Khajaguda - Nanakramguda Road. It is the tallest commercial tower in South India.  SAS iTower will be 38 floors (171 metres) at completion. First 5 floors is mall-multiplex portion.
 A residential-cum-commercial complex 'Thrive' at Khajaguda is being planned over 5.32 acres of land parcel.

Schools 
 Oakridge International School
 Delhi Public school, Khajaguda , Hyderabad

Hospitals
 Sparsh Hospice

Food and Beverage (F&B)
 1980's Military Hotel
 Tosh-e-daan
 Cafe Rasasvada

Vicinity

The landmarks Near Khajaguda are Ananthaswamy hills (Boda gutta), Delhi public school, Raidurgam police station, Baskin robbins and MJR magnifique. There are few gigantic rock formations known as Khajaguda Hills (Fakhruddin Gutta). Fakhruddin Gutta heritage site (rock formation) is divided between Puppalguda and Khajaguda villages. Fakhruddin Gutta granite rock formations (popularly known as Khajaguda Hills) are as old as 2.5 billion years. Khajaguda Rock Formation, which is prehistoric heritage site, is spread across . The tomb of Saint Hazrat Baba Fakhruddin Aulia — spiritual mentor of Ala-ud-Din Bahman Shah (founder of the Bahmani Kingdom) who was buried here in 1353 AD; an over 800-year-old Annatha Padmanabha Swamy Temple and a cave where the revered saint, Meher Baba had meditated are situated on Khajaguda Hills (Fakhruddin Gutta).

Public transport
Hyderabad Airport Express Metro will pass through  Khajaguda - Nanakramguda Road. Khajaguda is connected by buses run by TSRTC, since a HCU Bus Depot is close by, it is well connected.

Link Roads
 0.95 km Link Road connecting Old Mumbai Highway at ESCI with Khajaguda road near DPS.
 2.20 km Link road from Khajaguda Lake to ORR, parallel to Urdu University compound wall and Oakridge International School.
 Outer Ring Road -Lanco Hills link road is under construction as part of Corridor 39B. This 3.89 km long link road is constructed along side the Khajaguda Heritage Rock Formation.

See also
 Gachibowli
 Manikonda
 Kokapet
 Society to Save Rocks
 Puppalaguda

References

Neighbourhoods in Hyderabad, India